Macrocheilus vanharteni is a species of ground beetle in the subfamily Anthiinae. It was described by Felix & Muilwijk in 2007.

References

Anthiinae (beetle)
Beetles described in 2007